Hyalolaena is a genus of flowering plants belonging to the family Apiaceae.

Its native range is Iran to Xinjiang and Afghanistan.

Species:

Hyalolaena bupleuroides 
Hyalolaena intermedia 
Hyalolaena issykkulensis 
Hyalolaena jaxartica 
Hyalolaena lipskyi 
Hyalolaena transcaspica 
Hyalolaena trichophylla 
Hyalolaena tschuiliensis 
Hyalolaena zhang-minglii

References

Apioideae
Apioideae genera
Taxa named by Alexander von Bunge